Ahtiana is a genus of lichenized fungi known as candlewax lichens in the family Parmeliaceae. A monotypic genus, it contains the single species Ahtiana sphaerosporella or the mountain candlewax lichen, found in western North America. This species was segregated from the genus Parmelia by Canadian lichenologist Trevor Goward in a 1985 publication. It had been suggested that the genus include A. aurescens (Eastern candlewax lichen, formerly Cetraria aurescens Tuck.) and A. pallidula (pallid candlewax lichen, formerly Cetraria pallidula Tuck.) based on similarities in morphology, but this transfer is not supported by molecular analysis.

The genus was named in honour of Finnish botanist Teuvo Tapio Ahti.

References

Parmeliaceae
Monotypic Lecanorales genera
Lichen genera
Taxa described in 1986